Ece Türkoğlu (born April 14, 1999) is a Turkish women's football midfielder currently playing in the Turkish Women's First League as captain for  Fatih Karagümrük with jersey number 10. She was part of the Turkey girls' national U-15 team, is still member of the girls' national U-17  and women's national U-19 teams.

Early life 
Ece Türkoğlu was born in İmranlar village of Karadeniz Ereğli in Zonguldak Province on April 14, 1999. She completed the primary school with honors in Çayırlı, and currently studies in Karadeniz Ereğli Science High School. Signed with Old Dominion University.

=Club career 

Ece Türkoğlu is a member of Kdz. Ereğlispor, for which she obtained her license on May 25, 2011. After appearing one season in the Women's First League with her team in the 2011–12 season, she played the next season in the Girls' U-15 Turkey Championship for her club's newly established youth team for girls, and enjoyed winning the title in September 2013. From the 2013–14 season on, she plays in the Women's First League again. Currently, she serves as the captain of her team.

Türkoğlu took part at the 2018–19 UEFA Women's Champions League qualifying round, and played in all three matches of the qualification round.

After one season with Ataşehir Belediyespor, she returned to her main club Kdz. Ereğlispor.

International career 

She debuted in the Turkey girls' national U-15 tram in the friendly match against Belarus on November 28, 2011, and netted a goal. She capped three times and scored three goals for the girls' national U-15 team.

Türkoğlu played in the Turkey girls' national U-17 team, and took part at the 2014 UEFA Women's Under-17 Development Tournament and 2015 UEFA Women's Under-17 Championship qualification – Group 8 matches. She appeared in 18 matches and netted five goals.

She was part of the Turkey women's U-19 team, and played at the 2014 Kuban Spring Tournament. She was part of the team, which became champion of the 2016 UEFA Development Tournament. She took part at the 2017 UEFA Women's Under-19 Championship qualification – Group 10, 2018 UEFA Women's Under-19 Championship qualification – Group 10 and Elite round – Hroup 2 matches. She capped in 30 matches, and scored 7 goals for the national U-19 team.

Türkoğlu debuted in the Turkey women's national team at the UEFA Women's Euro 2017 qualifying Group 5 match against Hungary and scored one goal. Further, she played in three matches of the GoldCity Woöem's Cup 2017 and in two matches of the 2019 FIFA Women's World Cup qualification – UEFA preliminary round.

Career statistics

Honors

Club 
 Turkish Women's First League
 Kdz. Ereğlispor
 Third places (1): 2012–13

 Ataşehir Belediyespor
 Winners (1): 2017–18

 Turkish Women's Super League
 Fatih Karagümrük
 Runners-up (1): 2021–22

International 
UEFA Development Tournament
 Turkey women's U-19
 Winners (1): 2016

References

External links 

Living people
1999 births
People from Karadeniz Ereğli
Turkish women's footballers
Women's association football midfielders
Karadeniz Ereğlispor players
Ataşehir Belediyespor players
Old Dominion Monarchs women's soccer players
Turkey women's international footballers
Turkish expatriate women's footballers
Turkish expatriate sportspeople in the United States
Expatriate women's soccer players in the United States
Fatih Karagümrük S.K. (women's football) players